This is a list of places on the National Register of Historic Places in Concord, Massachusetts.

Concord

|}

References

 
Concord
Concord, Massachusetts